New Albury Hotel is a heritage-listed Australian pub at 491 Kiewa Street, Albury, City of Albury, New South Wales, Australia. It was designed by W. H. Merritt and built from 1939 to 1939 by Snider Constructions. It is also known as Hotel Albury. It was added to the New South Wales State Heritage Register on 2 April 1999.

History 
The hotel was designed in 1939 by W. H. Merritt, an architect and engineer from Melbourne. It was built for the Richmond N. S. Brewing Company Pty. Limited. When first built it was named the Hotel Albury but later it became known as the New Albury Hotel. Snider Constructions was the builder and the estimated cost was 25,000 pounds.

Description 
The building is a five-storey framed structure faced in cream bricks on three sides with red bricks at the rear. The front façade has a cantilevered verandah at street level and concrete balconies with a white rendered finish above. It is well detailed, well maintained and in original condition. Important exterior details include the rounded corner windows and the horizontal banding effect created by the balconies and cream brick spandrels.

The building is in original condition, except for new metal fire stairs.

Heritage listing 
Built in 1939, the New Albury Hotel is considered to be an excellent example of the international style, well detailed, well maintained and in excellent condition. Similar public buildings, derived from the teachings of Bauhaus, survive in most of the capital cities, but they are exceedingly rare in country towns. This building is significant for its rarity as an example of Bauhaus / International style outside the great cities. It is an important focal building in the centre of Albury and within the designated conservation area.

Being five stories high, it is the first "high rise" building in Albury, and thus dominant in the streetscape. The state heritage listing states that its dominance should be retained over any future developments in the area.

New Albury Hotel was listed on the New South Wales State Heritage Register on 2 April 1999 having satisfied the following criteria.

The place is important in demonstrating aesthetic characteristics and/or a high degree of creative or technical achievement in New South Wales.

Being five stories high, it is the first "high rise" building in Albury, and thus dominant in the streetscape.

The place possesses uncommon, rare or endangered aspects of the cultural or natural history of New South Wales.

Similar public buildings, derived from the teachings of Bauhaus, survive in most of the capital cities, but they are exceedingly rare in country towns. This building is significant for its rarity as an example of Bauhaus / International style outside the great cities.

See also

References

Bibliography

Attribution

External links

New South Wales State Heritage Register
Albury, New South Wales
Pubs in New South Wales
Articles incorporating text from the New South Wales State Heritage Register
Bauhaus